For the 1995 Eurovision Song Contest, held in Dublin for the second consecutive year, the United Kingdom entered "Love City Groove", performed by Love City Groove. It finished in 10th place with a total of 76 points.

Before Eurovision

A Song for Europe 1995 
A Song for Europe 1995 was the national final developed by the BBC in order to select the British entry for the Eurovision Song Contest 1995. Eight acts competed in a televised show on 31 March 1995 held at the BBC Television Centre in London and hosted by Terry Wogan. The winner was selected entirely through a public vote. The final was broadcast on BBC1 and BBC Radio 2 with commentary by Ken Bruce, while the results show was broadcast on BBC1.

After the UK only achieved a low top ten finish the previous year, the BBC returned to a format last seen in 1991 where different acts performed, each song was also introduced by a Eurovision style "postcard" style video showcasing the song writers introduced by Jonathan King. The panel was adapted into a famous celebrity "supporter", with the public televote remaining.

Competing entries 
BBC collaborated with music producer Jonathan King to select eight finalists to compete in the national final. The eight competing songs were premiered during the Top of the Pops Song for Europe Special on BBC1 on 24 March 1995.

Final 
Eight acts competed in the televised final on 31 March 1995. Each song was introduced by a supporter who championed the songs during the show. The supporters consisted of Tony Mortimer, Bruno Brookes, Ian Dury, Let Loose, Scarlet, Cheryl Baker, Mike Read and Jonathan King. A public televote selected the winner, "Love City Groove" performed by Love City Groove.

At Eurovision
The United Kingdom performed 15th on the night, following Belgium and preceding Portugal. Love City Groove received 76 points and finished joint 10th with Malta. The UK jury awarded 12 points to Israel, with ten points going to Slovenia.

Voting

References

1995
Countries in the Eurovision Song Contest 1995
Eurovision
Eurovision